Patrick Scherberger is an American comic book penciller, known for his work on the book Marvel Adventures: Spider-Man.

Career
Scherberger's career began when he entered and won an internet competition called Comic Book Idol in 2004.  During the competition he was contacted by Joe Quesada to do a formal try-out for Marvel Comics and, as a result of this, was soon chosen to pencil Marvel Adventures: Spider-Man.

Bibliography
 Couch Press Presents #1: "William; Bottom of the Barrel" (Couch Press, 1996)
 Marvel Age: Hulk #1: "Cowboys and Robots" (with Mike Raicht, Marvel Comics, 2004)
 The Path #22: "Men of Honor" (with Ron Marz, CrossGen, 2004)
 Marvel Adventures: Spider-Man (pencils, with Kitty Fross and inks by Norman Lee, Marvel Comics, 2005–2008)

External links

Tingley, Scott. Spider-Man Previews and Interview; Comics in the Classroom; October 2006

Year of birth missing (living people)
Living people
American comics artists